The Arab Open University (AOU) is a non-profit university. The inception of AOU is a personal initiative by Prince Talal bin Abdulaziz Al Saud, the Chairman of the AOU Board of Trustees. In December 2000, Kuwait was designated to host the Headquarters of AOU.

The AOU first phase was launched in October 2002 in three branches: Kuwait, Lebanon and Jordan. Branches in Bahrain, Egypt and Saudi Arabia were opened in 2003. Branches were opened in Oman in February 2008 and in Sudan in September 2013. In May 2015, AOU signed an agreement of opening a new branch in Palestine with the Palestinian Ministry of Higher Education.

Academic programmes
Under the partnership agreement with the Open University, UK, AOU offers a range of academic programmes taught in English:

Undergraduate Programmes
BA Programme (Hons) in Business Administration  (BA), offered in one of the following tracks:
 Management
 Marketing
 Accounting
 Accounting (Arabic
 Systems Practice
BSc Programme (Hons) in Information Technology and Computing (ITC), offered in one of the following tracks:
 Information Technology and Computing (ITC)
 Computing (C)
 Information and Communication Technology (ICT)
 Computing with Business (CwB)
BSc Programme (Hons) in Graphic and Multimedia Design (in some of AOU's branches)
BA Programme (Hons) in English language & Literature (ELL):
 Translation Track
BA Programme (Hons) in English Language and Literature with Business (ELL with BS)
BA Programme (Hons) in Media is offered in the following specializations (Egypt Branch):
 Electronic Media
 Radio and Television
 Public Relations
And offered in the following tracks:
 Electronic Media (Track) (Jordan & Lebanon)
 Public Relations (Track) (Jordan)
BA Programme (Hons) in Education in Elementary Education
BA Programme (Hons) in Special Education / Learning Disabilities
BA Programme (Hons) in Special Education, offered in two tracks:
 Learning Disabilities
 Mental Retardation
Postgraduate Programmes (in some of AOU's branches)
Master of Business Administration (MBA)
MSc in Computing Programme
MSc in Computing – Information Security and Forensics
Postgraduate Diploma in Computing*MA in English Literature*High/General Diploma in Education   
Master of Education in Education Technology
Master of Education in Educational Leadership

Branches
In alphabetical order:

References

 
Education in the Middle East
Private universities and colleges in Saudi Arabia
Universities in Bahrain
Universities in Egypt
Universities in Oman
Universities and colleges in Sudan
Education in Amman
Education in Beirut
Education in Cairo
Education in Jeddah
Education in Khartoum
Education in Riyadh
2002 establishments in Saudi Arabia
Educational institutions established in 2002
Organizations based in Kuwait City
Open universities